Boyer's Food Markets, Inc. is an American supermarket chain that operates stores in eastern Pennsylvania.

History
Boyer's was founded in 1949 by Harold S. Boyer  Orwigsburg, Pennsylvania. The company has since expanded to a total of 19 stores in eastern Pennsylvania, including Ashland, Bernville, Berwick, Birdsboro, Elysburg, Fleetwood, Frackville, Hazleton, Lansford, Lykens, McAdoo, Mt. Carmel, Orwigsburg, Schuylkill Haven, Shenandoah, Tamaqua, Womelsdorf, and Yorkville and Pine Grove.  The current slogan of Boyer's Food Markets is "Shop fast and save money," used in their current logo. Boyer's sells a variety of groceries, including generic brands such as Essential Everyday.

The company today is owned by the executive management operating team, consisting of Dean Walker, President/CEO, Matthew Kase, CFO, Anthony Gigliotti, EVP Sales/Marketing, and Mike Zmitrovich, EVP Store Operations.

See also 

 SuperValu

References

External links 
 Boyers Food Markets

Retail companies established in 1949
Companies based in Schuylkill County, Pennsylvania
Supermarkets of the United States
American companies established in 1949
1949 establishments in Pennsylvania